Cape Santa Clara, Gabon is a peninsula extending from the Gabon Estuary near the port of Owendo.

Overview 
The larger peninsula that separates the Gabon estuary from Corisco Bay, the cape juts into the mouth of the estuary.

The cape is near Libreville, the capital city of Gabon 

The Santa Clara Rock Formation is also visible.

Transport 

Cape Santa Clara is the proposed site for a new port for the export of iron ore from Belinga.

Photos 
 Plage de Santa Clara

See also 

 Gabon Estuary - 
 Railway stations in Gabon

References 

Populated places in Estuaire Province